Tomáš Kyzlink (born June 18, 1993) is a Czech basketball player for Limoges CSP of the LNB Pro A, and the Czech national team.

Professional career
He averaged 12.7 points per game during the 2019–20 season with Virtus Roma.

Kyzlink signed a 1+1 contract with Pallacanestro Reggiana on June 27, 2020. He used the exit option, and therefore left the team, at the end of the season.

On September 20, 2021, Kyzlink returned to Czech Republic signing wth USK Praha.

On January 3, 2023, he signed with Limoges CSP.

National team career
He participated at the EuroBasket 2017.

References

1993 births
Living people
Brose Bamberg players
CB Estudiantes players
Czech expatriate basketball people in France
Czech expatriate basketball people in Germany
Czech expatriate basketball people in Italy
Czech expatriate basketball people in Slovenia
Czech expatriate basketball people in Spain
Czech men's basketball players
Helios Suns players
JL Bourg-en-Bresse players
Lega Basket Serie A players
Limoges CSP players
Mens Sana Basket players
Pallacanestro Virtus Roma players
People from Vyškov
Reyer Venezia players
Shooting guards
Sportspeople from the South Moravian Region
USK Praha players